Thulinius is a genus of water bear or moss piglet, a tardigrade in the class Eutardigrada.

Species
 Thulinius augusti (Murray, 1907)
 Thulinius ruffoi (Bertolani, 1982)
 Thulinius stephaniae (Pilato, 1974)

References

External links

Parachaela
Tardigrade genera
Polyextremophiles